is a city located in Ōita Prefecture, Japan on the eastern coast of the island of Kyushu. The city was founded on April 29, 1941.

On March 3, 2005, Saiki merged with the towns of Kamae, Kamiura, Tsurumi, Ume and Yayoi, and the villages Honjō, Naokawa and Yonōzu (all from Minamiamabe District) to create the new and expanded Saiki City. Minamiamabe District was dissolved as a result of this merger.

As of March 2017, the new city has an estimated population of 73,546 (former city, 2003: 49,183)  and a population density of 81 persons per km2. The total area is 903.44 km2, making it the largest city by area in Kyushu.

Geography

Climate
Saiki has a humid subtropical climate (Köppen climate classification Cfa) with hot summers and cool winters. Precipitation is significant throughout the year, but is somewhat lower in winter.

Demographics
Per Japanese census data, the population of Saiki in 2020 is 66,851 people. Saiki has been conducting censuses since 1920.

Sport
During the 2002 World Cup, Saiki was the base camp for the Tunisia national football team.

Sister city
In the sister city program, Saiki is twinned with the Australian port city Gladstone, Queensland, as well as a sister city with Handan, China.

References

External links

 Saiki City official website 

Cities in Ōita Prefecture
Port settlements in Japan
Populated coastal places in Japan
Geography articles needing translation from Japanese Wikipedia